Kejin (also Romanized as Kejīn and Kajīn) is a village in Sanjabad-e Gharbi Rural District, in the Central District of Kowsar County, Ardabil Province, Iran. At the 2006 census, its population was 17, in 5 families.

References 

Tageo

Towns and villages in Kowsar County